The Wolf River is a  tributary of the Missouri River in northeastern Kansas in the United States, draining an area of  in the Dissected Till Plains region.

According to a 2001 study by the Kansas Department of Health and Environment, 71% of the Wolf River watershed is cropland, 25% is grassland, 3% is woodland, and 0.5% is urban.

Variant names
According to the Geographic Names Information System, the Wolf River has also been known historically as:
Petite Riviere de Cansez 
Riviere du Loup
Shun-ta-nesh-nanga
Wolf Creek

See also
List of Kansas rivers

References 

Rivers of Brown County, Kansas
Rivers of Doniphan County, Kansas
Rivers of Kansas
Tributaries of the Missouri River